Rashleighite, also called henwoodite, is a ferrian variety of turquoise. The names are in honour of the Cornish geologists Philip Rashleigh and  William  Jory Henwood.

References

Collins (1876) Mineralogical Magazine: 1: 11.
Fairbanks (1942) The Mineralogist, Portland, Oregon: 10: 44 (as ferri-turquois).
Foster (1876) Mineralogical Magazine: 1: 8.
Ross (1876) Chem. News, October 13th.
Ross (1876) Mineralogical Magazine: 1: 59.
Russell (1948) Mineralogical Magazine: 28: 353.
Palache, C., Berman, H., & Frondel, C. (1951), The System of Mineralogy of James Dwight Dana and Edward Salisbury Dana, Yale University 1837-1892, Volume II. John Wiley and Sons, Inc., New York, 7th edition, revised and enlarged, 1124 pp.: 947, 951.

Phosphate minerals